Paul Skjodt (born June 28, 1958) is an American-Canadian businessman, and former ice hockey player.

Early life
Paul Skjodt was born in Toronto, Ontario, Canada, on June 28, 1958.

Ice hockey career
From 1975, he played ice hockey for the Kitchener Rangers, Windsor Spitfires, Royal York Royals, Toronto Nationals, Erie Blades and the Crowtree Chiefs.

In 1986, Skjodt moved to Indianapolis in 1986 to pursue a career with the Indianapolis Checkers of the International Hockey League.

Skjodt founded and owned the now defunct Indiana Ice hockey team of the USHL, that won the Clark Cup Championship in 2009 and 2014.

Property developer
In 2014, Skjodt was planning on building a $25 million 250,000-square-foot sports complex in northwest Indianapolis.

Personal life
In 1987, he married Cindy Simon, the daughter of Melvin Simon and Bess Simon. They have three children, Erik, Samantha and Ian.

They are leading political donors, giving $6.6 million to the Democratic Party in the 2018 elections.

In 2015, their Samerian Foundation (founded in 2003) created a $20 million endowment, and the United States Holocaust Memorial Museum in Washington, D.C. renamed its Center for the Prevention of Genocide as The Simon-Skjodt Center for the Prevention of Genocide.

References

1958 births
Living people
Businesspeople from Indianapolis
Businesspeople from Toronto
Erie Blades players
Ice hockey players from Indiana
Indianapolis Checkers (CHL) players
Kitchener Rangers players
Sportspeople from Indianapolis
Ice hockey people from Toronto
Hamilton Nationals players
Windsor Spitfires players
Simon family (real estate)